The Ven. Jack Cattell was Archdeacon of Bermuda from 1961 until 1982.

He was educated at Durham University and Salisbury Theological College;  and ordained in 1940. He was President of the Durham Union for Epiphany term of 1938. After  a curacy in Royston he was a Chaplain to the British Armed Forces from 1942 to 1946. He was also a teacher: serving at Dauntsey's School, Richmond School and Wanstead High School. He was Head teacher of Whitney Institute from 1953 until his appointment as Archdeacon.

References

Alumni of Salisbury Theological College
British military chaplains
20th-century English Anglican priests
Archdeacons of Bermuda
1915 births
Year of death missing
Presidents of the Durham Union
Alumni of University College, Durham